Mahoddam Kirti Shah was a Prince of the Gorkha Kingdom. He was active during the Unification of Nepal led by his brother, King Prithvi Narayan Shah.

He also held the rank of Chautaria. In 1744, he commanded the Battle of Nuwakot with Kalu Pande, and Prithvi Narayan Shah.

His two sons Balbhadra Shah, and Srikrishna Shah also held the rank of the Chautaria.

References 

18th-century Nepalese nobility
18th-century Nepalese people
Nepalese Hindus
Nepalese princes
People from Gorkha District
People of the Nepalese unification